Syngrapha is a genus of moths of the family Noctuidae.

Species

 Syngrapha abstrusa Eichlin & Cunningham, 1978
 Syngrapha ain Hochenwarth, 1785
 Syngrapha alias (Ottolengui, 1902)
 Syngrapha altera Ottolengui, 1902
 Syngrapha alticola Walker, [1858]
 Syngrapha angulidens Smith, 1891
 Syngrapha borea Aurivillius, 1890 (syn: Syngrapha lula Strand, 1917)
 Syngrapha celsa (H. Edwards, 1881)
 Syngrapha composita Warren, 1913
 Syngrapha cryptica Eichlin & Cunningham, 1978
 Syngrapha devergens Hübner, [1813]
 Syngrapha diasema Boisduval, 1829
 Syngrapha epigaea Grote, 1874
 Syngrapha gilarovi Klyuchko, 1983
 Syngrapha hochenwarthi Hochenwarth, 1785
 Syngrapha ignea Grote, 1864
 Syngrapha interrogationis Linnaeus, 1758
 Syngrapha microgamma Hübner, [1823]
 Syngrapha montana Packard, 1869
 Syngrapha octoscripta Grote, 1874
 Syngrapha orophila Hampson, 1908
 Syngrapha ottolenguii Dyar, 1903
 Syngrapha parilis Hübner, [1809]
 Syngrapha rectangula (Kirby, 1837)
 Syngrapha rilaecacuminum Varga & Ronkay, 1982
 Syngrapha sackenii Grote, 1877
 Syngrapha selecta (Walker, [1858])
 Syngrapha surena Grote, 1882
 Syngrapha tibetana Staudinger, 1895
 Syngrapha u-aureum Guenée, 1852
 Syngrapha viridisigma Grote, 1874

References
 Natural History Museum Lepidoptera genus database
 Syngrapha at funet.fi

Plusiinae
Noctuoidea genera